Longtail snake may refer to the following genus:
 Enulius

It may also refer to the following species:
 Colombian longtail snake, Enuliophis sclateri